An 1868 marble statue of Alexander Hamilton by Horatio Stone is installed in the United States Capitol's Hall of Columns, in Washington, D.C.

References

1868 sculptures
Statues of Alexander Hamilton
Marble sculptures in Washington, D.C.
Monuments and memorials in Washington, D.C.
Sculptures of men in Washington, D.C.
United States Capitol statues